The Louisiana State Treasurer special election took place on October 14, 2017, to elect the state treasurer of Louisiana, with a runoff election to be held on November 18, 2017, if necessary. Incumbent Republican State Treasurer John Kennedy was elected to the U.S. Senate in 2016.  First Assistant Treasurer Ron Henson replaced Kennedy as treasurer, and served until the special election. Henson did not run in the special election.

Under Louisiana's jungle primary system, all candidates appeared on the same ballot, regardless of party and voters may vote for any candidate, regardless of their party affiliation. If no candidate receives a majority of the vote during the primary election, a runoff election will be held between the top two candidates. Louisiana is the only state that has a jungle primary system (California and Washington have a similar "top two primary" system). Republican candidates received over 65% of the vote as John Schroder and Derrick Edwards advanced to the runoff. Republican John Schroder defeated Democrat Derrick Edwards in the runoff.

Candidates

Republican Party

Declared
 Angele Davis, businesswoman and former commissioner of the Louisiana Department of Administration
 Terry Hughes
 Neil Riser, state senator and candidate for LA-05 in 2013
 John Schroder, state representative

Withdrew
 Julie Stokes, state representative

Declined
 Ron Henson, incumbent state treasurer
 Rob Maness, retired United States Air Force colonel and candidate for U.S. Senate in 2014 and 2016

Democratic Party

Declared
 Derrick Edwards, attorney and candidate for U.S. Senate in 2016

Libertarian Party

Declared
 Joseph D. Little

Jungle primary

Runoff

References

External links
Derrick Edwards (D) for Treasurer
Mike Lawrence (R) for Treasurer
Joseph Little (L) for Treasurer
Neil Riser (R) for Treasurer
John Schroder (R) for Treasurer
Julie Stokes (R) for Treasurer

State Treasurer
Treasurer 2017
Louisiana State Treasurer elections